The 2006–07 Northern Mariana Championship was the inaugural season of top flight football competition in Northern Marianas Islands. A competition with four confirmed participants (their names are not recorded in available sources) was planned to start in November 2005, but was ultimately cancelled. The competition was won by L&A/Kyung-Seung from Sadog Tasi with Fiesta Inter Saipan from Garapan finishing as runners up and Real Mariana in third place.

League table
The league was played on a round robin basis with all teams playing each other once. The league table below is final, Onwell Manufacturing from Susupe (also known as Thai Squad) were added to the league over the Christmas period between rounds two and three. The final games were not played.

Results

References

Marianas Soccer League seasons
North
football
football